Club Beisbol Barcelona is a División de Honor de Béisbol baseball club located in Barcelona, Catalonia, Spain. The club was formed in February 2012 after breaking from the FC Barcelona sports club.

The club currently play at the Pérez de Rozas Baseball Field.

References

Baseball teams in Spain
Baseball teams in Catalonia